Standish Hall, at 718-820 US 395 E. in Standish, California, was built in 1907.  It was listed on the National Register of Historic Places in 2005.

Its first floor was a store and the second floor served as a meeting hall serving, at different times, the Lassen Lodge #421 I.O.O.F. (Odd Fellows), Nataqua Parlor #152, Native Daughters of the Golden West, Lassen County Sheriff's Posse and the Standish #220 Foresters of America. It also served for 4H meetings, Future Farmers of America, and for dance lessons and fundraisers.

References

National Register of Historic Places in Lassen County, California
Clubhouses on the National Register of Historic Places in California
1907 establishments in California
Cultural infrastructure completed in 1907